"Let's Go" is a song by Dutch disc jockey and producer Tiësto with vocals from Swedish duo Icona Pop, who co-wrote the song with Tiësto, Oscar Holter, Marcus Sepehrmanesh, Alx Reuterskiöld and Karl-Ola Solem Kjellholm. It was released on 13 May 2014 by PM:AM Recordings as the third single from Tiësto's fifth studio album, A Town Called Paradise.

"Let's Go" was featured in the soundtracks of numerous films or TV shows, such as Night at the Museum: Secret of the Tomb, Pitch Perfect 2, Vacation, Sisters, Red Band Society, Hawaii Five-0 or the teaser trailer for the 2018 animated film Teen Titans Go! To the Movies.

Background and release 
Tiësto declared about the song : "It's a very energetic track with so much energy in it. When I hear that track [...], the only thing I want is to go out !"

Reception 
Nolan Freeney of Time considers that "Tiësto’s production doesn’t grind quite as hard as the singers’ past hits, and the added acoustic guitars feel like a blatant effort to capitalize on the success of Avicii’s “Wake Me Up!” but all of that is forgivable: the track’s highs are euphoric enough to get the job done."

Track listing 
Digital Download
 "Let's Go" - 3:22

Charts

References 

2014 songs
2014 singles
Tiësto songs
Icona Pop songs
Songs written by Tiësto
Songs written by Aino Jawo
Songs written by Caroline Hjelt
Songs written by Marcus Sepehrmanesh